Ninian Park railway station serves the Leckwith and South Canton areas of Cardiff, just outside Cardiff city centre.

It was fully opened to regular passenger service in 1987 when the City Line reopened to passenger services . As the station was built for main line special trains it has the longest platforms on the line, accommodating up to nine coaches, rather than two coaches as at the other three stations opened at the same time. The station is near the former Cardiff City F.C. stadium and is next to the South Wales Main Line, but trains on this route do not stop. Cardiff Canton Traction Maintenance Depot is adjacent to the station.

History
The original halt at Ninian Park was opened on 2 November 1912 by the Great Western Railway, it was rebuilt in 1933, but was closed to regular services on 10 September 1939. Following this it continued to be used periodically for football specials. On 5 October 1987 the station was reopened for regular services when a regular passenger service was introduced to the Cardiff City Line.

Stadium
Cardiff City Stadium is within five minutes' walk of the station, over the road from the station's namesake Ninian Park Stadium. However, trains do not run to the station within three hours of a match due to fears that platforms cannot safely accommodate large numbers of passengers attending.

Services
This drops to hourly during the evenings. There is no Sunday service.

From December 2015 a limited number of mainline trains (Maesteg Line services) call at Ninian Park, rejoining the mainline at Leckwith Junction to the west of the station. This route is also occasionally used as a diversionary route for GWR services. Additionally, Vale of Glamorgan Line trains terminate here when  is unavailable due to engineering works.

See also
List of railway stations in Cardiff
Rail transport in Cardiff

References

External links

Railway stations in Cardiff
DfT Category F2 stations
Former Great Western Railway stations
Railway stations served by Transport for Wales Rail
Railway stations in Great Britain opened in 1912